François-Zéphirin Tassé (May 14, 1825 – February 20, 1886) was a physician and political figure in Quebec. He represented Jacques Cartier in the Legislative Assembly of the Province of Canada from 1858 to 1864.

He was born in Saint-Martin, Quebec, the son of Pierre Tassé, the son of François Tassé, and Marie Valiquette, and was educated at the Petit Séminaire de Sainte-Thérèse. He apprenticed as a physician and practised in Saint-Laurent, Montreal and Saint-Vincent-de-Paul. Tassé served as a governor of the College of Physicians and Surgeons for Lower Canada and as a federal medical examiner. He also served on the town council for Saint-Laurent and as mayor. Tassé married Rose-de-Lima Painchaud in 1846. He resigned his seat in 1864 to become inspector of prisons. In 1873, he was named director of the Saint-Vincent-de-Paul prison at Laval. Tassé died in Montreal at the age of 60 and was buried in the Notre Dame des Neiges Cemetery.

References 

1825 births
1886 deaths
Members of the Legislative Assembly of the Province of Canada from Canada East
Mayors of places in Quebec
Burials at Notre Dame des Neiges Cemetery